Björn Borg defeated the defending champion Guillermo Vilas in the final, 6–1, 6–1, 6–3 to win the men's singles tennis title at the 1978 French Open. Borg did not lose a set during the tournament, and dropped only 32 games in total, which remains a French Open record.

This tournament marked the first major appearance of Ivan Lendl.

Seeds
The seeded players are listed below. Björn Borg is the champion; others show the round in which they were eliminated.

  Björn Borg (champion)
  Guillermo Vilas (final)
  Brian Gottfried (third round)
  Eddie Dibbs (quarterfinals)
  Manuel Orantes (quarterfinals)
  Raúl Ramírez (quarterfinals)
  Corrado Barazzutti (semifinals)
  Harold Solomon (third round)
  Roscoe Tanner (fourth round)
  Dick Stockton (semifinals)
  Wojtek Fibak (fourth round)
  Phil Dent (first round)
  Tim Gullikson (fourth round)
  Buster C. Mottram (third round)
  John Alexander (fourth round)
  Stan Smith (third round)

Draw

Key
 Q = Qualifier
 WC = Wild card
 LL = Lucky loser
 r = Retired

Finals

Top half

Section 1

Section 2

Section 3

Section 4

Bottom half

Section 5

Section 6

Section 7

Section 8

External links
 Association of Tennis Professionals (ATP) – 1978 French Open Men's Singles draw
1978 French Open – Men's draws and results at the International Tennis Federation

Men's Singles
French Open by year – Men's singles
1978 Grand Prix (tennis)